Nicole Bonnefoy (born 11 August 1958) is a member of the Senate of France, representing the Charente department. She is a member of the Socialist Party.

Biography 
A parliamentary assistant for Jérôme Lambert, Bonnefoy was elected Senator for Charente on 21 September 2008. She was re-elected on 28 September 2014 and 27 September 2020. 

During the 2015 Charente Departmental Election, Bonnefoy was elected in the Canton of Boixe-et-Manslois with Patrick Berthault. Their alternates are Bernard Lacoeuille and Christine Soury.

During the 2017 presidential election, she sponsored En Marche! candidate Emmanuel Macron.

Summary of mandates 

 Senator for Charente (2008—incumbent).
 Departmental Councillor of Charente (2008—incumbent).
Regional Councillor of Poitou-Charentes (1998—2008).
 Vice-President of the Regional Council of Poitou-Charentes (2004—2008).

See also 

 List of senators of Charente

References

1958 births
Living people
Socialist Party (France) politicians
French Senators of the Fifth Republic
Women members of the Senate (France)
Senators of Charente